Willem Hendrik Toet (born 29 March 1952) is an Australian Formula One aerodynamicist. He is currently the Senior Sales Manager and Aerodynamics consultant for Sauber Aerodynamics and Alfa Romeo Racing. He was previously the head of aerodynamics for the Sauber F1 team but stepped down in 2015.

Biography
Toet, after graduating from at University of Melbourne and La Trobe University in 1974, joined Ford Australia. In 1977 he started working as a racing engineer in Australian Formula 2 and Australian Formula Ford. In 1982 he moved to Great Britain, where he was the chief mechanic and engineer of sports cars.

In 1985 he joined the team of Toleman (then Benetton), where he was responsible for aerodynamics and the wind tunnel. After 1994, he joined the Scuderia Ferrari team as head of the aerodynamics department. In 1999 he moved to British American Racing (then Honda) where he became a senior aerodynamicist and design engineer and worked until 2005. On January 13, 2006, he became head of the aerodynamics department at BMW Sauber.

In 2010 he became the managing director of the RML Group, and in November 2011 he returned to Sauber as the head of aerodynamics. He remained with the team until 2015 when he went into part-retirement and now works as a consultant for Sauber Aerodynamics connecting the F1 and non-F1 aspects of the business.

References

Living people
Formula One designers
Australian motorsport people
21st-century Australian engineers
1952 births
Sauber Motorsport
Benetton Formula
Alfa Romeo in Formula One